= Legion of Heroes =

- Directed by: Juan Fortuny; Armando Seville
- Written by: Arturo Buendía; Mauricio Hernández
- Cinematography: Juan Fortuny; Juan Mariné
- Edited by: Antonio Cánovas
- Music by: Juan Suñe Sintes
- Production company: Zenit Helios Films
- Release date: 3 September 1942
- Running time: 88 minutes
- Country: Spain
- Language: Spanish

Legion of Heroes (Spanish:Legión de héroes) is a 1942 Spanish war film directed by Juan Fortuny and Armando Seville and starring Emilio Sandoval, Matilde Nacher and Rosita Alba. It is about an officer who, moved to action by the beautiful daughter of a Muslim chieftain, dies undertaking a dangerous mission.

== Cast ==
- Emilio Sandoval
- Matilde Nacher
- Rosita Alba
- Javier Rodil
- Tomás Pallás
- Luis Cortés
- Fernando Velasco
- Salvador Malonda
- La Brazalema

== Bibliography ==
- Bentley, Bernard. A Companion to Spanish Cinema. Boydell & Brewer 2008.
